"The Game Is Over" is a song performed by American rock band Evanescence. The song was released as a digital download on July 1, 2020 by BMG as the second single from the band's fifth studio album, The Bitter Truth. The song was written by the band and produced by Nick Raskulinecz.

Background
In a statement, Amy Lee said, "This song is about being sick of the facade. The disguises we wear for others to make them feel comfortable, the inside feelings being so different than what we show on the outside to fit within the boundaries of what's socially acceptable, or what's not going to make you unpleasant or too 'weird' to be around."

The track has been described as a heavy metal song that "brings back the nostalgia" of grunge and early 2000's emo, and has been compared to the music of Nirvana and Tool.

Music video
An official music video to accompany the release of "The Game Is Over" was first released onto YouTube on July 3, 2020. The video was filmed by each member of the band on their phones while in isolation, in collaboration with director P.R. Brown.

Personnel
Credits adapted from Tidal.
 Nick Raskulinecz – producer
 Evanescence – composer, lyricist, associated performer
 Nathan Yarborough – engineer
 Ted Jensen – mastering engineer
 Nick Raskulinecz – mixing engineer, recording engineer

Charts

Release history

References

2020 songs
2020 singles
Evanescence songs
Song recordings produced by Nick Raskulinecz
American heavy metal songs